Ane Mintegi del Olmo (born 24 October 2003) is a Spanish tennis player. She has a career-high singles ranking by the Women's Tennis Association (WTA) of 377, achieved on 7 February 2022. She also has a career-high WTA doubles ranking of 789, set on 20 September 2021.

Mintegi won the girls' singles title at the 2021 Wimbledon Championships.

ITF finals

Singles: 2 (2 runner–ups)

Junior Grand Slam titles

Singles: 1 (1 title)

References

External links

2003 births
Living people
Spanish female tennis players
Grand Slam (tennis) champions in girls' singles
Wimbledon junior champions
Tennis players from the Basque Country (autonomous community)